Operation: Mindcrime may refer to:
Operation: Mindcrime, the third studio album by the American progressive heavy metal band Queensrÿche
Operation: Mindcrime (band), progressive metal band named after the above album
Operation: Mindcrime II, the ninth studio album by the American progressive heavy metal band Queensrÿche